The 1976–77 Illinois State Redbirds men's basketball team represented Illinois State University during the 1976–77 NCAA Division I men's basketball season. The Redbirds, led by second year head coach Gene Smithson, played their home games at Horton Field House and competed as an independent (not a member of a conference). They finished the season 22–7.

The Redbirds received an invitation to the 1977 National Invitation Tournament. It was their first postseason appearance as an NCAA Division I member. They defeated Creighton University in the regional round and lost to the University of Houston in the quarterfinal round.

Roster

Schedule

|-
!colspan=9 style=|Regular Season

|-
!colspan=9 style=|National Invitation {NIT} Tournament

References

Illinois State Redbirds men's basketball seasons
Illinois State
Illinois State